Vipera orlovi is a species of venomous snake in the family Viperidae. The species is endemic to Russia.

Taxonomy
V. orlovi was described as a species new to science by Boris S. Tuniyev and Sergei V. Ostrovskikh in 2001.

Etymology
The specific name, orlovi, is in honor of Russian herpetologist Nikolai Lusteranovich Orlov (born 1952).

Geographic range
V. orlovi is found in the Caucasus area of Russia.

Habitat

Reproduction
V. orlovi is viviparous.

References

Further reading
Phelps T (2010). Old World Vipers: A natural history of the Azemiopinae and Viperinae. Frankfurt am Main, Germany: Edition Chimaira. 558 pp. .
Schweiger M (2009). "Die Giftschlangen Europas: Eine Übersicht der Arten und Bemerkungen zu einzelnen Taxa ". Reptilia (Münster) 14 (76): 14–25. (Vipera dinniki orlovi, new combination). (in German).
Tuniyev BS, Ostrovskikh SV (2001). "Two new species of vipers of kaznakovi complex (Ophidia, Viperidae) from western Caucasus". Russian Journal of Herpetology 8 (2): 117–126. (Vipera orlovi, new species).

External links
Vipera orlovi at viperacaucasica.googlepages.com.

Vipera
Reptiles described in 2001
Snakes of Asia
Reptiles of Russia